The 2019 American Cup was part of the World Cup circuit in artistic gymnastics.

Participants 
The top 8 teams from the 2018 World Championships were allowed to send a competitor.  If they declined the invite, the next highest ranked team could send a competitor.  Marcel Nguyen of Germany withdrew after suffering an injury during practice.  Kenzo Shirai of Japan also withdrew due to an ankle injury.

Results

Women

Men

Nastia Liukin Cup 

The 10th annual Nastia Liukin Cup was held in conjunction with the 2019 American Cup. Since its inception in 2010, the competition has always been held on the Friday night before the American Cup, in the same arena.

Medal winners

Notable competitors 
Junior competitor Zoe Miller would go on to compete at the 2020 Olympic Trials.

References 

American Cup (gymnastics)
American Cup
American Cup
American Cup